Lung volumes and lung capacities refer to the volume of air in the lungs at different phases of the respiratory cycle.

The average total lung capacity of an adult human male is about 3 litres of air.

Tidal breathing is normal, resting breathing; the tidal volume is the volume of air that is inhaled or exhaled in only a single such breath.

The average human respiratory rate is 30–60 breaths per minute at birth, decreasing to 12–20 breaths per minute in adults.

Factors affecting volumes
Several factors affect lung volumes; some can be controlled, and some cannot be controlled. Lung volumes vary with different people as follows:

A person who is born and lives at sea level will develop a slightly smaller lung capacity than a person who spends their life at a high altitude. This is because the partial pressure of oxygen is lower at higher altitude which, as a result means that oxygen less readily diffuses into the bloodstream. In response to higher altitude, the body's diffusing capacity increases in order to process more air. Also, due to the lower environmental air pressure at higher altitudes, the air pressure within the breathing system must be lower in order to inhale; in order to meet this requirement, the thoracic diaphragm has a tendency to lower to a greater extent during inhalation, which in turn causes an increase in lung volume.

When someone living at or near sea level travels to locations at high altitudes (e.g. the Andes; Denver, Colorado; Tibet; the Himalayas) that person can develop a condition called altitude sickness because their lungs remove adequate amounts of carbon dioxide but they do not take in enough oxygen. (In normal individuals, carbon dioxide is the primary determinant of respiratory drive.)

Lung function development is reduced in children who grow up near motorways although this seems at least in part reversible. Air pollution exposure affects FEV1 in asthmatics, but also affects FVC and FEV1 in healthy adults even at low concentrations.

Specific changes in lung volumes also occur during pregnancy. Functional residual capacity drops 18–20%, typically falling from 1.7 to 1.35 litres, due to the compression of the diaphragm by the uterus. The compression also causes a decreased total lung capacity (TLC) by 5% and decreased expiratory reserve volume by 20%. Tidal volume increases by 30–40%, from 0.5 to 0.7 litres, and minute ventilation by 30–40% giving an increase in pulmonary ventilation. This is necessary to meet the increased oxygen requirement of the body, which reaches 50 ml/min, 20 ml of which goes to reproductive tissues. Overall, the net change in maximum breathing capacity is zero.

Values

The tidal volume, vital capacity, inspiratory capacity and expiratory reserve volume can be measured directly with a spirometer. These are the basic elements of a ventilatory pulmonary function test.

Determination of the residual volume is more difficult as it is impossible to "completely" breathe out. Therefore, measurement of the residual volume has to be done via indirect methods such as radiographic planimetry, body plethysmography, closed circuit dilution (including the helium dilution technique) and nitrogen washout.

In absence of such, estimates of residual volume have been prepared as a proportion of body mass for infants (18.1 ml/kg), or as a proportion of vital capacity (0.24 for men and 0.28 for women) or in relation to height and age ((0.0275* Age [Years]+0.0189*Height [cm]−2.6139) litres for normal-mass individuals and (0.0277*Age [Years]+0.0138*Height [cm]−2.3967) litres for overweight individuals).  Standard errors in prediction equations for residual volume have been measured at 579 ml for men and 355 ml for women, while the use of 0.24*FVC gave a standard error of 318 ml.

Online calculators are available that can compute predicted lung volumes, and other spirometric parameters based on a patient's age, height, weight, and ethnic origin for many reference sources.

British rower and three-time Olympic gold medalist Pete Reed is reported to hold the largest recorded lung capacity of 11.68 litres; US swimmer Michael Phelps is also said to have a lung capacity of around 12 litres.

Weight of breath 
The mass of one breath is approximately a gram (0.5-5 g). A litre of air weighs about 1.2 g (1.2 kg/m3). A half litre ordinary tidal breath weighs 0.6 g; a maximal 4.8 litre breath (average vital capacity for males) weighs approximately 5.8 g.

Restrictive and obstructive

The results (in particular FEV1/FVC and FRC) can be used to distinguish between restrictive and obstructive pulmonary diseases:

See also
Pulmonary function testing (PFT)
Spirometry

References

External links 
Lung function fundamentals (anaesthetist.com)
Volume of human lungs

Respiratory physiology
Pulmonary function testing